Kuttanellur is a residential area situated in the City of Thrissur in Kerala state of India. Kuttanellur is Ward 27 of Thrissur Municipal Corporation. It is around 6 km away from the Swaraj Round. Kuttanellur is home to Oushadhi, a Kerala Government undertaking for manufacturing Ayurvedic medicines and a Government Arts College. It is accessible from Thrissur town and via NH 47, connecting Thrissur with Ernakulam. This national highway passes through Kuttanaellur, where there is a highway bridge. The proposed Thrissur Zoological Park at Puthur is in four kilometers from Kuttanellur Bypass Junction. Nearest suburban areas are Mannuthy and Ollur. It is famous for its Bhagavathi temple and the annual Kuttanellur Pooram. Kuttanellur is home to Oushadhi, a Kerala Government undertaking for manufacturing Ayurvedic medicines and Sri C. Achutha Menon Government College.

References

See also
 Thrissur
 Thrissur District

Suburbs of Thrissur city